SP-Forth is a Forth system producing optimized native code for the Intel x86 processors. It runs on MS Windows 9x, NT and Linux. Authors: Russian Forth Interest Group with the help of many contributors. It was started by Andrey Cherezov in 1992.

Related projects

External links 
 

Concatenative programming languages
Forth programming language family
Free compilers and interpreters